Greek-Hungarian relations are relations between Greece and Hungary. Both countries established diplomatic relations on July 7, 1956. Both countries exchanged embassies in the other one's capital on August 24, 1964.
Both countries are full members of NATO, OECD, OSCE, European Union and the Council of Europe. There are around 2,500 people of Greek descent living in Hungary. Meanwhile, there are around 2,000 people of Hungarian descent living in Greece, according to an assessment of 2011.

Military cooperation
A Hungarian military contingent participated in a NATO mission to assist Greece in ensuring security during the 2004 Summer Olympics.

List of bilateral visits
 In April 1998, the President of Greece Konstantinos Stephanopoulos visited Hungary
 In November 2000, the Prime Minister of Greece Kostas Simitis visited Hungary
 In January 2003, the Prime Ministers of Hungary Péter Medgyessy visited Greece
 In September 2003, the President of Hungary Ferenc Mádl visited Greece

List of bilateral treaties

 Air Cooperation agreement (1963)
 Agreement on the Avoidance of Double Taxation on Income (1984)
 Agreement on the promotion and Protection of Investments (1989)
 Agreement on Economic, Industrial and Technological Cooperation (1980)
 Agreement on international road transport (1977)
 Tourism Cooperation Agreement (1987)
 Agreement on agricultural cooperation (2001)

Diplomacy

Hellenic Republic
Budapest (Embassy)

Hungary
Athens (Embassy)

See also 
 Foreign relations of Greece
 Foreign relations of Hungary
 Greeks in Hungary
 Beloiannisz
 Accession of Hungary to the European Union

References

External links
Greek Ministry of Foreign Affairs about the relation with Hungary
Greek embassy in Budapest
 Hungarian embassy in Athens 

 
Hungary
Greece